The 2013 Geneva Open Challenger was a professional tennis tournament played on hard courts. It was the 26th edition of the tournament which was part of the 2013 ATP Challenger Tour. It took place in Geneva, Switzerland between 28 October and 3 November 2013.

Singles main-draw entrants

Seeds

 1 Rankings are as of 21 October 2013.

Other entrants
The following players received wildcards into the singles main draw:
  Stéphane Bohli
  Sandro Ehrat
  Karen Khachanov
  Alexander Ritschard

The following players received entry from the qualifying draw:
  Grégoire Burquier
  Matteo Donati
  Michael Lammer
  Yann Marti

The following players received entry as a Lucky Loser:
  Laurent Recouderc

Champions

Singles

 Malek Jaziri def.  Jan-Lennard Struff 6–4, 6–3

Doubles

 Oliver Marach /  Florin Mergea def.  František Čermák /  Philipp Oswald 6–4, 6–3

External links
Official Website

Geneva Open Challenger
Geneva Open Challenger